USS Caldwell (DD-69) was the lead ship of her class of destroyers built for the United States Navy in the 1910s.

Description
They had a crew of 5 officers and 95 enlisted men.

The propulsion arrangements differed between the ships of the class. Caldwell was powered by two Curtis steam turbines, each driving one propeller shaft, using steam provided by four Thornycroft boilers. Caldwell reached  during sea trials.

The ships were armed with four 4-inch (102 mm) guns in single mounts and were fitted with two  1-pounder guns for anti-aircraft defense. Their primary weapon, though, was their torpedo battery of a dozen 21 inch (533 mm) torpedo tubes in four triple mounts. During World War I, the 1-pounders were replaced by 3-inch (76 mm) anti-aircraft (AA) guns and a "Y-gun" depth charge thrower replaced the aft AA gun and the searchlight.

Construction and career
Caldwell was launched 10 July 1917 by Mare Island Navy Yard, sponsored by Miss C. Caldwell, and commissioned 1 December 1917, Lieutenant Commander B. McCandless in command. She was the first Navy ship named for Lieutenant James R. Caldwell (1778-1804).
Ordered to join the Atlantic Fleet, Caldwell reached Norfolk, Virginia, 8 January 1918, and Queenstown, Ireland, 5 March. She participated in patrol and convoy escort duty, which were interrupted when Caldwell aided in urgent experimental work on underwater listening devices to employ against German submarines.

Caldwell returned home for operations with the Norfolk Division, Destroyer Force, Atlantic Fleet, and with Destroyer Squadron 3 along the United States East Coast during 1919. Placed in reserve in August 1920, she operated with a reduced complement out of Charleston, South Carolina, and Newport, Rhode Island. She was decommissioned at Philadelphia Navy Yard 27 June 1922. She was sold there 30 June 1936.

Notes

References

External links
http://www.navsource.org/archives

 

Caldwell-class destroyers
World War I destroyers of the United States
Ships built in Vallejo, California
1917 ships